× Elepogon, abbreviated Elp, is an intergeneric hybrid of orchids (family Orchidaceae) between the genera Calopogon and Eleorchis.

References 

Arethusinae
Orchid nothogenera